Lucius Fayette Clark Garvin (November 13, 1841 – October 2, 1922) was an American physician and the 48th Governor of Rhode Island from 1903 to 1905.

Biography

Origins and family 

Lucius Garvin was born in 1841 in Knoxville, Tennessee. His father, James Garvin, was a professor at East Tennessee University. In 1862, Lucius graduated from Amherst College. With the American Civil War under way, he enlisted as a private in Company E of the 51st Regiment Massachusetts Volunteer Infantry.

After the war, Garvin was trained as a physician at Harvard Medical School. He interned at Boston City Hospital and graduated in 1867, setting up a private practice in Pawtucket, Rhode Island. In 1869, he married Dr. Lucy Waterman Southmayd (b. 1833), a recent graduate of New England Female Medical College and physician at South Hadley Ladies Seminary. They had three daughters: Ethel, Norma and Florence. In 1876, Garvin relocated to Lonsdale, Rhode Island.

Political career 

Garvin became involved in politics, serving first as town moderator for Cumberland, Rhode Island in 1881. He became known as a progressive in the mold of Henry George, championing a "Single Tax”, popular initiative, and proportional representation. As an advocate of labor, he spoke out to improve the working conditions of local textile factory workers and endorsed a shorter workday. As a Democrat, he was unusually successful in the Republican stronghold of the northeast.

In 1883, Garvin was elected to the first of many terms in the Rhode Island House of Representatives. He also served several terms in the Rhode Island Senate, and campaigned persistently, but without success, to represent Rhode Island's 2nd congressional district. In 1902, he was elected to the first of two consecutive terms as Governor of Rhode Island. Due to the Brayton Act of 1901, passed by the securely Republican State Senate to limit the powers of the Governor's office, Garvin was unable to make any executive, legislative or judicial appointees. He successfully fended off an electoral challenge from industrialist Samuel P. Colt in 1903, and was briefly discussed as a possible candidate to challenge incumbent president Theodore Roosevelt in the 1904 U.S. Presidential Election.

Garvin became identified with anti-corruption reform, and was widely quoted on the subject. In a speech to the Rhode Island General Assembly, he said: "Bribery is so common and has existed for so many years that the awful nature of the crime ceases to impress." He furnished information for Lincoln Steffens' muckraking article, "Rhode Island: A State for Sale," published in 1905 in McClure's.

Later life 

Lucy Garvin had died 1898, and in 1907, Lucius married Sarah Emma Tomlinson, a graduate of Perkins School for the Blind. They had two sons, Lucius and Sumner.

Lucius Garvin died October 2, 1922 in his office in Lonsdale. His obituary in the New York Times described him as "picturesque figure" known throughout the state, adding that he had never owned an automobile, preferring to travel by bicycle.

Garvin was buried at Swan Point Cemetery, in Providence, Rhode Island.

References

External links
 Lucius Garvin at the Political Graveyard
 

1841 births
1922 deaths
Democratic Party governors of Rhode Island
Amherst College alumni
Harvard Medical School alumni
People from Cumberland, Rhode Island
Politicians from Knoxville, Tennessee
Burials at Swan Point Cemetery